This is a timeline documenting events of Jazz in the year 1933.

Events

 Louis Armstrong goes on a tour to Europe. He is a sensation on all stages in which he appears, and fills the Tivoli in Copenhagen eight nights in a row.
 The Duke Ellington Band travels to Europe, and they are well received in England. Ellington is considered a significant composer in London.
 Ellington records "Solitude" and "Sophisticated Lady".
 Teddy Wilson is in New York City playing with the Benny Carter Band.
  Bessie Smith records for the last time in a session arranged by John Hammond. "Gimme a Pigfoot" was recorded at this session.
 Billie Holiday was discovered by John Hammond in Monette's in New York City. Billie record her singing with Benny Goodman.

Standards

Deaths

 March
October 12th, Jimmy Wade, jazz trumpeter (born 1895)
 26 – Eddie Lang, American guitarist, regarded as Father of Jazz Guitar (born 1902).

 July
 15 – Freddie Keppard, jazz cornetist (born 1889).

 September
 30 – William Krell, American bandleader and composer (born 1868).

Births

 January
 1
 Bill Saragih, Indonesian musician (died 2008).
 Hideo Shiraki, Japanese drummer and bandleader (died 1972).

 February
 1 – Sadao Watanabe, Japanese saxophonist.
 2 – Orlando "Cachaito" López, Cuban bassist (died 2009).
 3 – John Handy, American saxophonist.
 17 – Spike Heatley, British bassist.
 20 – Charles Kynard, American organist (died 1979).
 21 – Nina Simone, American singer and pianist (died 2003).
 24 – David "Fathead" Newman, American saxophonist (died 2009).

 March
 3 – Jimmy Garrison, American upright bassist (died 1976).
 4 – Ann Burton, Dutch singer (died 1989).
 14
 Duke Carl Gregor of Mecklenburg, member of the House of Mecklenburg-Strelitz and a music and art historian (died 2018).
 Quincy Jones, American conductor, composer and trumpeter.
 17 – Dick Maloney, Canadian singer (died 2010).
 23
 Andrzej Trzaskowski, Polish composer and musicologist (died 1998).
 Dave Frishberg, American pianist, vocalist, and composer.
 26 – Donald Bailey, American drummer (died 2013).
 28 – Tete Montoliu, Spanish-Catalonian pianist (died 1997).

 April
 6 – Bill Hardman, American trumpeter and flugelhornist (died 1990).
 8 – Paul Jeffrey, American tenor saxophonist (died 2015).
 21 – Ian Carr, Scottish trumpeter, composer, writer, and educator (died 2009). 
 27 – Calvin Newborn, American guitarist (died 2018).
 28 – Oliver Jackson, American drummer (died 1994).

 May
 5 – Cal Collins, American guitarist (died 2001).
 14 – Stu Williamson, American trumpeter (died 1991).
 20 – Charles Davis, American saxophonist and composer (died 2016).
 22 – Eivind Solberg, Norwegian trumpeter (died 2008).
 24 – Michael White, American violinist (died 2016).
 30 – Michael Garrick, English pianist and composer (died 2011).

 June
 20 – Lazy Lester, American singer and guitarist (died 2018).

 July
 1 – Rashied Ali, American drummer (died 2009).
 17 – Ben Riley, American drummer (died 2017).
 20 – Mario Schiano, Italian saxophonist (died 2008).

 August
 4 – Sonny Simmons, American saxophonist (died 2021).
 10 – Trudy Pitts, American keyboardist (died 2010).
 15 – Bill Dowdy, American drummer (died 2017).
 19 – Asmund Bjørken, Norwegian accordionist and saxophonist (died 2018).
 25
 Rune Gustafsson, Swedish guitarist (died 2012).
 Wayne Shorter, American saxophonist and composer.
 27 – Rudolf Dašek, Czech guitarist (died 2013).
 31 – Herman Riley, American tenor saxophonist (died 2007).

 September
 1 – Gene Harris, American pianist (died 2000).
 11 – Baby Face Willette, American Hammond organist (died 1971).
 30 – Steve McCall, American drummer (died 1989).

 October
 2 – Ronnie Ross, British baritone saxophonist (died 1991).
 18 – Bross Townsend, American pianist (died 2003).
 19 – Jimmy Dotson, American singer, guitarist, and drummer (died 2017).
 23 – Gary McFarland, composer, vibraphonist, and singer (died 1971).
 25 – Jack Petersen, American guitarist, pianist, and composer.

 November
 11
 Marlene VerPlanck, American singer (died 2018).
 Sture Nordin, Swedish upright bassist (died 2000).

 December
 1
 Billy Paul, Congolese singer and musician (died 2016).
 Lou Rawls, American singer and songwriter (died 2006).
 4 – Denis Charles, American drummer (died 1998).
 13 – Borah Bergman, American pianist (died 2012).
 14 – Leo Wright, American saxophonist (died 1991).
 16 – Johnny "Hammond" Smith, American organist (died 1997).
 17
 John Ore, American bassist (died 2014).
 Walter Booker, American upright bassist (died 2006).
 18 – Lonnie Brooks, American blues singer and guitarist (died 2017).
 23 – Frank Morgan, American saxophonist (died 2007).
 26 – Billy Bean, American guitarist (died 2012).
 29 – Brian Brown, Australian saxophones (died 2013).
 30 – Lanny Steele, American pianist (died 1994).

 Unknown date
 Jim Newman, American saxophonist and television producer.
 Nikele Moyake, South African tenor saxophonist (died 1966).

See also
1933 in music

References

External links
 History Of Jazz Timeline: 1933 at All About Jazz

Jazz, 1933 In
Jazz by year